The siliqua (plural siliquae) is the modern name given (without any ancient evidence to confirm the designation) to small, thin, Roman silver coins produced in the 4th century A.D. and later. When the coins were in circulation, the Latin word siliqua was a unit, perhaps of weight defined by one late Roman writer as one twenty-fourth of a Roman solidus.

Since gold was worth about 12 times as much as silver in ancient Rome (in Diocletian's Edict of Maxmimum Prices of 301), such a silver coin would have a theoretical weight of 2.22 grams ((4.45 grams/24)x12 = 2.22 grams). This has not prevented the term from being applied today to silver coins issued by Constantine, which initially weighed 3.4 grams and to the later silver (heavy) "siliqua" of Constantius II of c. 3 grams, but it would fit the later "reduced siliqua" from after the reform of 355 which weighed about 2.2 grams. These are called "light" or "reduced" siliquae to differentiate them. The term is one of convenience, as no name for these coins is indicated by contemporary sources. Thin silver coins as late as the 7th century AD which weigh about 2–3 grams are known as siliquae by numismatic convention.

The majority of examples suffer striking cracks (testimony to their fast production) or extensive clipping (removing silver from the edge of the coin), and thus to find both an untouched and undamaged example is fairly uncommon. It is thought that by clipping, siliquae provided the first coinage of the Saxons, as this reduced them to around the same size as a sceat, and there is considerable evidence from archaeological sites of this period, that siliquae and many other Roman coins were utilized by Saxons as pendants, lucky charms, currency and curiosities.

See also
 Roman currency
 Hoxne Hoard, a hoard of 14,212 silver siliquae dating from the early 5th century.

References and external links 

Coins of ancient Rome
Numismatics
Silver coins